

Events
1709 : Tatler founded by Richard Steele

New books and plays
1700: The Way of the World by William Congreve
1702: The Shortest Way with the Dissenters by Daniel Defoe
1703: Hymn to the Pillory by Daniel Defoe
1704: The Campaign by Joseph Addison; Miscellany Poems by William Wycherley
1705: The Mistake by Sir John Vanbrugh; The Gamester by Susanna Centlivre
1706: The Recruiting Officer (play) – George Farquhar
1707: Essay Concerning the Use of Reason  – Anthony Collins;  The Beaux' Stratagem – George Farquhar

Births
June 28, 1703 : John Wesley (died 1791)
April 22, 1707 : Henry Fielding (died 1754)
September 18, 1709 : Samuel Johnson (died 1784)

Deaths
May 12, 1700 : John Dryden (born 1631)
May 26, 1703 : Samuel Pepys (born 1633)
February 27, 1706 : John Evelyn (born 1620)

See also
List of years in literature

References 

 
Literature